The Astra A-100 is a Spanish double-action/single-action semi-automatic pistol that was manufactured by Astra-Unceta y Cia SA beginning in 1990. It was distributed in the United States by European American Armory (EAA).  The A-100 is also known as the "Panther" as imported into the United States by Springfield Armory, and some specimens have this roll-marked on the left of the slide.  The A-100 design is a further development of Astra's earlier A-80 and A-90 models. The A-80 was originally patterned after the SIG P220.

Design
The A-100 is a recoil-operated, locked breech design with improved Browning-style linkless locking.  The lock up is similar to the Browning High Power or CZ-75 with locking lugs on the top of the barrel which mate with lugs in the slide (not with a single lug in the ejection port like a SIG P22X.)  The pistol's safety features include a manual decocking lever, firing pin block, and hammer safety. The A-100 lacks a manual safety, but depends entirely on a deliberate pull of its trigger to fire it; in this way it is similar to the SIG P22X series of pistols.  The double-action trigger pull is relatively long and heavy, thereby precluding the need for a safety as the probability of an inadvertent discharge is low.

The A-100 resembles the SIG P228 and is similar in overall size and dimension, but differs in several respects, the most visible being the location of the take-down/disassembly lever on the right side of the frame (from the shooter's point of view) as compared to the SIG design, in which it is located on the left.  The A-100 is also slightly heavier than the SIG, owing to its all-steel construction.  Additionally, the A-100's chamber contour as visible when the slide is fully forward is rounded whereas the SIG design is squared.  The configuration of the hammer is also different, with the A-100 having a rounded hammer provided with a lanyard hole and the SIG having a more conventional spur hammer.  Magazines are not interchangeable between the A-100 and SIG pistols, however many holsters made for the SIG P229/228 fit the A-100 satisfactorily.

The various A-series pistols were submitted unsuccessfully as contenders for Spanish military contracts beginning in the 1970s. The Lebanese Forces political party named the A-80, A-90, and A-100 as a few of the many semi-automatic pistols in use by that organization's members.

Notes

External links
 Owner's Manual

.40 S&W semi-automatic pistols
.45 ACP semi-automatic pistols
9mm Parabellum semi-automatic pistols
Semi-automatic pistols of Spain